Tazehabad-e Kukav (also Romanized as Tāzehābād-e Kūkāv; also known as Tāzehābād) is a village in Howmeh-ye Jonubi Rural District, in the Central District of Eslamabad-e Gharb County, Kermanshah Province, Iran. At the 2006 census, its population was 44, in 9 families.

References 

Populated places in Eslamabad-e Gharb County